Anthony William Miller (born 26 October 1937) is an English retired footballer who played in the Football League as a forward for Colchester United.

Career

Born in Chelmsford, Miller joined Colchester United as an apprentice in 1954, but had to wait almost ten years to make his first-team debut. His first and only game for the club came at the age of 26 on 1 February 1964 in a 0–0 draw with Queens Park Rangers at Loftus Road.

References

1937 births
Living people
Sportspeople from Chelmsford
English footballers
Association football forwards
Colchester United F.C. players
English Football League players